Mikey Mileos (born 6 December 1980) is a stand up comedian and comedy writer from Sydney, Australia who lives in Los Angeles, United States.

In April 2009, Mileos was a national finalist in Triple J radio's Raw Comedy competition, a nationally televised event. Since then, he has played at almost every major comedy club in Australia. In 2010, he was selected to perform alongside a slew of international comedy veterans in the Sydney Comedy Festival's Cracker Night gala, a rare feat considering he did not actually have a show in the festival.

His unique comedic style combines observational comedy in an almost one-liner fashion, incorporating political and philosophical ideas and mixing them with his own brand of silliness.

As a comedy writer Mileos worked on the Australian hit television show Good News Week. Mileos has also worked as a freelance comedy writer for Australian lads magazine Zoo Weekly, but insists that it was only for the money.

Festival Shows
2011 Stupid People Will Be Offended - Edinburgh Fringe Festival (as Part of PBH's Free Fringe)
2011 They're Just Words - Melbourne International Comedy Festival, Sydney Comedy Festival

2010 These Are My Jokes - Melbourne International Comedy Festival
2010 Young Guns of Comedy (Sydney Comedy Showcase) - Adelaide Fringe Festival
2009 The Night Cap Featuring Jaymie Wilson, Mikey Mileos & Magesh - Melbourne International Comedy Festival

References

External links
 

1980 births
Australian male comedians
Living people